Tal Pathar, also known as Talpathar, is a village in Tinsukia district, Assam, India. As per the 2011 census of India, Tal Pathar has a population of 1,772 people including 887 males and 885 females.

Talpathar is militancy affected area for a long period.

References 

Villages in Tinsukia district